Zapped may refer to:

 Zapped!, a 1982 American teen comedy film
 Zapped (2014 film), a Disney Channel original film
 Zapped (TV series), a British television sitcom